Otto Guevara Guth (born 13 October 1960) is a politician in Costa Rica and founder of the Partido Movimiento Libertario (Libertarian Movement Party). He served in the Costa Rican legislature from 1998-2002 and 2014-2018. Guevara is currently the president of the Libertarian Movement Party and has been its candidate for president of Costa Rica in 2002, 2006, 2010 and 2014.

Personal history
Otto Guevara is the son of civil servants.  His father, Claudio, was a physician for Costa Rica’s social security system.  His mother, Mariechen, worked for the Social Security system before resigning to run the family's tourism business.

Guevara studied at the University of Costa Rica where he earned bachelor's degree in law followed by a Masters in International Business from National University and a second master's degree in Law with an emphasis on Conflict Resolution from Harvard University.  He was also a long-serving professor of law at the University of Costa Rica where he imparted his understanding of education and conflict resolution to his students.

In addition to his work as a lawyer and a professor, he has also made a name in tourism, commercial trade, and public policy.  He also produced and hosted a number of television and radio shows focused on his moderate pro-freedom message.

Political history
Failing to see any representation for his values in Costa Rica’s traditional parties, Guevara founded the Movimiento Libertario in 1994 to challenge the conventional orthodoxy of Costa Rican politics which he saw as lurching towards greater corruption and less respect for the individual rights of his people. He believes that the principles of moderate intervention of the State and more economic freedom as the best way to improve the lives of the Costa Rican people.

First elected to congress as the sole representative for the Movimiento Libertario in 1998, Guevara earned recognition as Costa Rica’s best legislator by the press every year of his first term. In 2002, Libertarian Movement, with Guevara as the presidential candidate, elected 6 members to Congress out of 57 seats, but few weeks later they lost a Congressman, declared independent. After a split within the party that saw a group of libertarian members leave, Guevara said his party was moving to be liberal and not libertarian.

The year 2006 saw the Libertarian Movement Party again elect 6 members to congress, but they lost again other Congressman. As a presidential candidate in 2006, Guevara earned almost 10% of the vote. In 2009, Guevara is elected presidential candidate for third time. In February 2010, Guevara lost the Presidential election with 20% of the vote for a third-place finish. 

Then in 2014 he ran for president one more time, but falling into an 11% of the votes and obtaining 4 members to the Congress one of them being himself. On election day, Guevara was involved in a religious controversy, as his girlfriend Deborah Formal was seen on national television pocketing part of the host after receiving Eucharist at Catholic Mass.

Guevara signed the Madrid Charter, a document drafted by the conservative Spanish political party Vox that describes left-wing groups as enemies of Ibero-America involved in a "criminal project" that are "under the umbrella of the Cuban regime".

In the 2022 elections, he ran for Congress but received just over 9,000 votes and did not win a seat.

References

External links
Movimiento Libertario Official Site
RELIAL Network of Latin America Libertarian/Classical Liberal Organizations
Reason Magazine interview with Otto Guevara

1960 births
Living people
People from San José, Costa Rica
Members of the Legislative Assembly of Costa Rica
Libertarian Movement (Costa Rica) politicians
Harvard Law School alumni
University of Costa Rica alumni
Costa Rican liberals
Signers of the Madrid Charter